This article covers the 2015–16 season for KF Tërbuni Pukë. They'll participate in the Kategoria Superiore and Albanian Cup.

Competitions

Kategoria Superiore

League table

Results summary

Results by round

Matches

Albanian Cup

First round

Second round

References

Terbuni Puke
KF Tërbuni Pukë seasons